Vilho Petter Nenonen (6 March 1883 – 17 February 1960) was a Finnish general.

Nenonen was born in Kuopio. He received his military education in the Hamina Cadet School 1896–1901, in the Mihailov Artillery School in St Petersburg 1901–1903, and in St Petersburg Artillery Academy 1906–1909. He served in the Imperial Russian army during World War I. When the Finnish Civil War began, he moved to Finland and was given the job of creating the artillery of general Mannerheim's White Army. After the war, Nenonen also served as the Minister of Defence between 1923 and 1924. During the Continuation War, he was a part of Mannerheim's inner circle. He was promoted to the rank of General of the artillery in 1941 and remains the only person to have held the rank.

As Finnish Defence Forces' Inspector of the Artillery, Nenonen played a large role in developing the Finnish artillery's training, equipment, and tactics. For example, the Fire Correction Circle developed in 1943 proved decisive in the defensive victory in the Battle of Tali-Ihantala in 1944 and was made standard equipment of the Finnish artillery by an order issued by Nenonen in July 1943. The trajectory calculation formulas he developed are still in use today by all modern artillery.

Nenonen received the Mannerheim Cross in 1945.

His medals and personal history are on display in The Artillery Museum of Finland.
Nenonen is buried at the Hietaniemi Cemetery.

References

1883 births
1960 deaths
People from Kuopio
People from Kuopio Province (Grand Duchy of Finland)
Finnish generals
Military personnel of the Russian Empire
Russian military personnel of World War I
People of the Finnish Civil War (White side)
Finnish military personnel of World War II
Knights of the Mannerheim Cross
Ministers of Defence of Finland